Edith T. Martin is an American artist and museum professional.

Life
She was born in Caroline County, Virginia. She moved to Washington D.C. where she earned a degree in Fine Arts from American University and also attended Georgetown University. She worked as an artist and museum technician at the Smithsonian American Art Museum and Renwick Gallery.

Martin was active in the arts community in Washington D.C. and advocated for exhibitions of the work of African American women artists in particular. She was affiliated with the D.C. Art Association, the Smithsonian Institution Women's Council, the National Conference of Artists, and the Washington Women's Art Center. She was a member of the Executive Board of the National Conference of Artists. Martin's works reside in several permanent art collections in the United States.

Martin participated in and curated many exhibitions, particularly at the Anacostia Neighborhood Museum, the Smithsonian American Art Museum and the Renwick Gallery.

Martin's work on a proposed February 1979 exhibit of Black women artists, Contemporary Afro-American Women Artists, helped create an archive of artists from the period.

References

American art curators
American women curators
Year of birth missing (living people)
Living people
African-American women artists
Artists from Virginia
Artists from Washington, D.C.
American University alumni
Georgetown University alumni
Smithsonian Institution people
People from Caroline County, Virginia
20th-century American artists
21st-century American artists
20th-century American women artists
21st-century American women artists
20th-century African-American women
20th-century African-American people
20th-century African-American artists
21st-century African-American women
21st-century African-American artists